The Cambridge Inter-Collegiate Christian Union, usually known as CICCU, is the University of Cambridge's most prominent student Christian organisation, and was the first university Christian Union to have been founded.  It was formed in 1877, but can trace its origins back to the formation of the Jesus Lane Sunday School in 1827 and the Cambridge Prayer Union in 1848.  CICCU's stated purpose is "to make Jesus Christ known to students in Cambridge".

Currently CICCU runs two main outreach activities – 'Events Week' in Lent term, and 'Big Questions' lunches on Fridays in St Andrew the Great which feature short talks and Q&As about questions of life and faith – along with a variety of occasional events, and bigger activities in colleges.

Students in many other universities followed Cambridge's lead in forming their own Christian Unions, beginning with OICCU being founded in Oxford in 1879. Initially CICCU was part of the Student Christian Movement, which it left in 1910 to provide a specifically conservative evangelical ministry in Cambridge. Again, OICCU and other Unions followed them in this move, and together they founded the Inter-Varsity Fellowship of Evangelical Unions in 1928, which now the Universities and Colleges Christian Fellowship or UCCF. UCCF spread to Canada in the same year and later to the United States, Australia (Australian Fellowship of Evangelical Students), New Zealand (Tertiary Students Christian Fellowship) and across the globe.

Membership declaration
Students who become members of CICCU are asked to sign the following statement, "I desire in joining this Union to declare my faith in Jesus Christ as my Saviour, my Lord and my God". This was one of the issues in the dispute with the SCM. However, this declaration is not necessary to attend any events, or become involved with helping.

Leadership
CICCU is led by Christian students from a wide variety of backgrounds, united in a common desire to "make Jesus Christ known to students in Cambridge." Past CICCU members have included Josh Moody, Basil Atkinson, Helen Roseveare, John W. Wenham, John Stott and Vaughan Roberts. The leadership operates on two levels – university wide and within colleges. A committee of eight students, known as the Exec organise CICCU. Two reps in each college lead college events and meetings.

Structure
There are weekly meetings in almost every college during term time – these include Bible study, prayer and praise. The college groups then meet together as a whole for Bible Teaching and prayer each week. The CICCU organises weekly talks, explaining what Christians believe, and discussion groups (Christianity Explored courses). The college groups organise termly events in the colleges where people can come and find out more about Christianity. Every year there is a high-publicity main event, during which events are held in most of the colleges and there are lunchtime and evening talks.

Doctrinal basis
CICCU adopts the doctrinal basis of UCCF#Doctrinal basis, to which it is affiliated.

Controversy
Attitudes towards homosexuality have been a particular area of controversy, in particular during their 2004 Promise Week event, in which it was alleged that homosexual relations were equated with bestiality. CICCU members deny that their organisation is anti-gay, stressing "equality in the sight of God", and point out that they love homosexual and heterosexual friends equally, as does God..

Recent comment on the CICCU has been more ambivalent – surprised by the intense focus on sharing rather than simply maintaining their faith, but impressed by the warmth of their welcome, and the depth of their conviction.

Presidents

From this point the usual tenure was from the Easter Term of one year to the Lent Term of the next

Sources in the Cambridge University Library

Affiliation
UCCF (Universities and Colleges Christian Fellowship)
IFES (International Fellowship of Evangelical Students)

See also
 Cambridge Seven
 Oxford Inter-Collegiate Christian Union

References

Bibliography
 Old Paths in Perilous Times: an account of the Cambridge Inter-Collegiate Christian Union, Basil F. C. Atkinson : London, Inter-Varsity booklet, 1932.
 A Cambridge Movement, J. C. Pollock: London, John Murray, 1953.
 Whatever Happened to the Jesus Lane Lot?, Oliver R. Barclay : Leicester, Inter-Varsity Press, 1977, .
 From Cambridge to the world: 125 years of student witness / Oliver R. Barclay and Robert M. Horn : Leicester, Inter-Varsity Press, 2002, .
 'The Rise of the Cambridge Inter-Collegiate Christian Union, 1910–1971', David Goodhew, in Journal of Ecclesiastical History Vol.LIV no.1, pp. 62–88.

External links
 Official website
 Tomorrow – CICCU Events Week 2019 website
 Life – CICCU Events Week 2020 website

CICCU
Christian
Religious organizations established in 1877
1877 establishments in England